The 1945 Navy Midshipmen football team represented the United States Naval Academy during the 1945 college football season. In their second season under head coach Oscar Hagberg, the Midshipmen compiled a 7–1–1 record, shut out three opponents and outscored all opponents by a combined score of 220 to 65. Navy was ranked No. 3 in the final AP Poll.

Schedule

References

Navy
Navy Midshipmen football seasons
Navy Midshipmen football